Trinity Lutheran Church and Cemetery is a historic Lutheran church and cemetery at 5430 NY 10 in Stone Arabia, Montgomery County, New York. Located immediately north is the Reformed Dutch Church of Stone Arabia.

The original log church, built in 1729, was burned to the ground by British forces led by Sir John Johnson during the October 19, 1780 Battle of Stone Arabia.  The current wooden framed structure was built in 1792.  It is a rectangular, gable roofed vernacular Federal style building with later Italianate modifications.  The cemetery was established in the early 18th century and contains approximately 25 burials.  The earliest extant gravestone dates to 1752.

It was added to the National Register of Historic Places in 2005.

References

External links
 
 

 

Lutheran churches in New York (state)
Churches on the National Register of Historic Places in New York (state)
Historic American Buildings Survey in New York (state)
Italianate architecture in New York (state)
Churches completed in 1792
Cemeteries on the National Register of Historic Places in New York (state)
Churches in Montgomery County, New York
Cemeteries in Montgomery County, New York
18th-century Lutheran churches in the United States
National Register of Historic Places in Montgomery County, New York
Lutheran cemeteries in the United States
Italianate church buildings in the United States